The 1854 Beckwith Expedition by Lieutenant Edward Griffin Beckwith surveyed an area that was subsequently used for the Western Pacific's 1910 Feather River Route (Oakland-Salt Lake City).

References

Black Rock Desert
History of United States expansionism